Nigel Roderick Brown  (born 1949) is a New Zealand painter living in Dunedin, New Zealand.

Early years 
Born in Invercargill in 1949, Brown grew up in Tauranga and was fortunate to have the established artist Fred Graham as an art teacher at Tauranga Boys' College. Between 1968 and 1971 he attended Elam School of Art, gaining valuable wisdom and inspiration from teachers Robert Ellis, Pat Hanly, Colin McCahon, Garth Tapper and Greer Twiss. Brown first began exhibiting in 1972 and his highly praised Lemon Tree series (1977) helped to consolidate his position in the art scene.

Career 
In 1981, he was awarded a QEII Arts Council Grant for travel to the United States, the United Kingdom and Western Europe. On his return, the impact of the Springbok tour protests, as well as a period living with fellow neo-expressionist artist Philip Clairmont that same year, had a lasting impression on Brown. A founding member of the pressure group VAANA (Visual Artists Against Nuclear Arms) in 1984, Brown's paintings and prints of this period tackled relevant issues not only on nuclear weaponry but also on feminism and the peace movement. This culminated in his 1985 exhibition Living in the Bomb Age, at the Dunedin Public Art Gallery.

Brown's practice examines his direct and personal articulation of the realities of the human condition. He is profoundly aware of the relationship between human beings and their environment. Symbolism such as the fern, black singlet, dog and driveway, James K. Baxter and Captain Cook, all reflect his experience, his observations and his beliefs. He has woven these into a complex web over a period of more than 40 years.

In his early work he combined a tension and personal narrative centred on social issues in New Zealand topography. His later work included the socio-political world of the distinctly New South Pacific, while in his current practice, he continues to emphasize his vision of a New Zealand identity.

Brown has also undertaken two significant stained glass window designs – St Mary's Catholic Church, Auckland (1991) and Holy Trinity Cathedral, Parnell (1998). In 1998 he travelled to Antarctica as part of the inaugural 'Artist to Antarctica' programme.

Awards 
In the 2004 New Year Honours, Brown was appointed an Officer of the New Zealand Order of Merit, for services to painting and printmaking, and in 2005 Brown was awarded a three-week residency in Russia hosted by the New Zealand ambassador in Moscow.

References

External links
Interview with Nigel Brown as conducted by Denys Trussell for the Cultural Icons project. Audio and video.
 Art New Zealand: Nigel Brown - Gains & Losses (Spring 1983) 
 Art New Zealand: Nigel Brown - Will to Meaning: A Painter's Language in the Fabric of History (Spring 2007) 
Interview with Nigel Brown as conducted by Richard Wolfe for the Cultural Icons project. Audio and video.

1949 births
Elam Art School alumni
Living people
New Zealand painters
Officers of the New Zealand Order of Merit
People from Invercargill
People educated at Tauranga Boys' College
Stained glass artists and manufacturers